Frank Sydney Roland "Johnnie" Johnson  (4 August 1917 – 10 May 2009) was an English cricketer and senior Royal Air Force officer. He played first-class cricket for several teams between 1941 and 1947. Johnson joined the RAF in 1935 and despite transferring to the British Indian Army for the early part of World War II, he spent 38 years in the RAF and left with the rank of air vice-marshal.

See also
 List of Delhi cricketers

References

External links
 

1917 births
2009 deaths
English cricketers
Combined Services cricketers
Delhi cricketers
Sindh cricketers
People from Shimla
Cricketers from Himachal Pradesh
Royal Air Force air marshals
Indian Army personnel of World War II
British Indian Army soldiers
Royal Air Force personnel of World War II
British people in colonial India
Military personnel of British India
Royal Air Force airmen